St. George is a Roman Catholic church in Bridgeport, Connecticut, part of the  Diocese of Bridgeport.

History 
Built originally for a Lithuanian congregation this parish in now nearly 80 percent Spanish-speaking. This elegant Romanesque Revival church dates from shortly after the founding of the parish in 1907.

References

External links 
 St. George - Diocesan information 
 Diocese of Bridgeport

Roman Catholic churches in Bridgeport, Connecticut
Roman Catholic churches completed in 1907
Roman Catholic Diocese of Bridgeport
1907 establishments in Connecticut
20th-century Roman Catholic church buildings in the United States